I've Gotta Be Me is an album by American singer Tony Bennett, originally released in 1969 on Columbia as CS 9882.

Track listing
"I've Gotta Be Me" (Walter Marks) - 2:54
"Over the Sun" (Jamie Moran Aguirre, Arturo Castro) - 2:50
"Play It Again, Sam" (Hal Hackady, Larry Grossman) - 3:43
"Alfie" (Burt Bacharach, Hal David) - 3:21
"What the World Needs Now Is Love" (Bacharach, David) - 2:44
"Baby Don't You Quit Now" (Johnny Mercer, Jimmy Rowles) - 2:50
"That Night" (Norman Gimbel, Lalo Schifrin) - 3:17
"They All Laughed" (George Gershwin, Ira Gershwin) - 2:44
"A Lonely Place" (Johnny Mandel, Paul Francis Webster) - 3:50
"Whoever You Are, I Love You" (Bacharach, David) - 4:20
"(Theme from) Valley of the Dolls" (André Previn, Dory Previn) - 3:37

Personnel
Tony Bennett – vocals
Peter Matz, Torrie Zito - conductor, arranger
Don Ashworth, Phil Bodner, Wally Kane, Romeo Penque, Pete Fanelli, Sol Schlinger, Joe Soldo, Bobby Tricarico - reeds
Marky Markowitz, John Bello, Al De Risi, Joe Ferrante, Joe Wilder, Ernie Royal, Marvin Stamm, Snooky Young - trumpet
Wayne Andre, John Messner, Tony Studd, Chauncey Welsch, Paul Faulise, J. J. Johnson, Fred Zito  - trombone
Joseph De Angelis, Paul Ingraham, Joseph Singer, Jim Buffington, Ray Alonge - French horn
John Bunch - piano
Gene Bertocini, Jim Mitchell, Bucky Pizzarelli - guitar
Margaret Ross - harp
Richard Davis, Milt Hinton, Homer Mensch, George Duvivier, Jack Lesberg - bass
Mel Lewis, Sol Gubin, Louis Bellson - drums
Jack Jennings, Dave Carey, Phil Kraus - percussion

Strings
Charles McCraken, George Ricci, Alan Shulman, Harvey Shapiro, Tony Sophos - violoncello
Lamar Alsop, Max Cahn, Paul Gershman, Emanuel Green, Joe Malin, Marvin Morgenstern, George Ockner, Gene Orloff, John Pintavalle, Matthew Raimondi, Julius Schachter, Gerald Tarack, Raoul Polikian, Max Polikoff, Fred Buldrini, Sylvan Shulman - violin
Julien Barber, Al Brown, Theodore Israel, Richard Dickler, Harold Furmansky, Harry Zaratzian, Harold Colletta, Harold Furmansky, David Schwartz, Emanuel Vardi - viola

References

1969 albums
Tony Bennett albums
Albums arranged by Peter Matz
Albums conducted by Peter Matz
Columbia Records albums